Janne Rønningen (born 25 June 1969) is a Norwegian comedian and presenter.

Janne Rønningen grew up in Stavern, Vestfold. She attended Forsøksgymnaset in Oslo, but did not complete her education. In 1991 Rønningen began work at the local radio station, Radiorakel in Oslo, and in 1994 she moved to NRK Radio, where she worked on Herreavdelingen and XL, among other shows with Espen Thoresen, on youth channel P3.

From 1998-2000 she was presenter of the youth programme Smørøyet on TV channel NRK1. Since then she has been seen on, among others, Trigger on NRK, Holger Nielsens metode and Mandagsklubben on TVNorge, where she also has her own series, Helt privat (together with Kristin Skogheim). From 2004 she has also worked for the advertising financed, national radio channel Radio Norge, with the programmes Rom 24 and Vær så god, Takkskalduha, among others.

Janne Rønningen has also worked freelance with her own stand up-show together with Stand Up Norge.

TV shows
2000 Helt privat
1998-00 Smørøyet

External links
Janne Rønningen's official home page

1969 births
People from Larvik
Living people
Norwegian women comedians
Norwegian stand-up comedians
Norwegian women television presenters